The Central European Football League (CEFL) is a European organization of American football which hosts two international competitions, CEFL Championship and CEFL Cup. The final game of the CEFL Championship playoffs is dubbed CEFL Bowl.

Until the formation of the CEFL Cup in 2017 the name of the organization was synonymous with its flagship competition – CEFL Championship, or simply "the league". Initially named Southeast European League of American Football (SELAF) it featured teams from Serbia and Slovenia in its introductory 2006 season. The following year teams from other countries joined ranks and the name was changed to the current one before the 2008 season. First 4 seasons of the league were played during the spring and autumn, with a month-and-a-half to a three-month summer break. Starting from 2010 season the competition takes place during the spring. Over its existence, the league was played intermittently by teams from: Austria, Bosnia and Herzegovina, Croatia, Czechia, Denmark, France, Germany, Hungary, Italy, Poland, Russia, Serbia, Slovakia, Slovenia, Sweden, Switzerland and Turkey.

The 2022 champions are Schwäbisch Hall Unicorns.

History

2006
The inaugural season featured a total of five teams: Belgrade Vukovi, Kragujevac Wild Boars, Novi Sad Dukes and Sirmium Legionaries from Serbia, as well as Ljubljana Silverhawks from Slovenia.

The first ever league champions were Wild Boars who beat Vukovi 23–12 in SELAF Bowl, played on FK Radnički stadium in Belgrade on 8 October.

2007
The second season was already a season of expansion for the league with two new teams. Joining the league were the top Hungarian team, Budapest Wolves, and CNC Gladiators, then of Austrian Division I (Austria 2nd highest level). Meanwhile, the Legionaries have left the competition. For the first time teams were split into two conferences: North and South. North Conference consisted of Gladiators, Silverhawks and Wolves and South Conference included three Serbian teams: Dukes, Vukovi and Wild Boars.

The final game was named CEFL Bowl II and took place on the Ada Ciganlija stadium in Belgrade on 27 October, with the title won by Vukovi after beating Wolves 28–27 in a dramatic fashion.

That season was also the first in which the league made it to television: the semifinal and the bowl game were broadcast on Serbian nationally covered TV Avala.

2008
The league changed its name to Central European Football League and the third season featured three new teams from three different countries: Bratislava Monarchs from Slovakia, Budapest Cowboys from Hungary and Zagreb Thunder from Croatia, while the Wild Boars did not return. The Cowboys and Thunder joined the South Conference, also filling the vacant spot made with the departure of the Wild Boars, while the Monarchs were placed in the North Conference.

In CEFL Bowl III, CNC Gladiators from Austria's 2nd highest level league beat Vukovi 14–8 at the Vienna Vikings' Ravelin football center in Vienna on 25 October.

2009
In the 2009 season, Cineplexx Blue Devils of Austria replaced the non-returning Monarchs. They joined a newly formed conference with Thunder, Vukovi and Wolves. The other conference consisted of 2008 champions, Gladiators, along with Cowboys, Dukes and Silverhawks.

The bowl game was again played on the Ada Ciganlija stadium in Belgrade on 24 October, with Vukovi reclaiming the title after beating Blue Devils 39–20.

The season was also a considerable milestone for the league, as multiple league games have been televised on a trans-European channel Sport Klub.

2010
The league changed format again in 2010, with the Turkish national champion Istanbul Cavaliers joining the league and Cowboys, Gladiators and Thunder not returning. Cavaliers were scheduled to play Blue Devils in the newly formed wild card cup, with the winner taking the final playoff spot.

The bowl game was played in Ivančna Gorica, Slovenia on 18 July, where Vukovi beat Silverhawks 42–20 to become the league champions once again.

2011
In the 2011 season the league saw the departure of Blue Devils and Dukes. Competition consisted of four teams, which were all national champions of their respective countries.

The title was again claimed by the Vukovi who beat the Wolves 34–33 in yet another dramatic bowl game between these two teams played on Margaret Island Athletic Center in Budapest on 23 July.

2012
Croatian top team Zagreb Patriots joined the league and Blue Devils rejoined, while Cavaliers departed. The league was renamed to Sport Klub CEFL after its main sponsor and had multiple league games broadcast on Sport Klub television channels.

CEFL Bowl VII was played on Ada Ciganlija stadium in Belgrade on 21 July, where the Silverhawks won their first title after beating the Vukovi 34–21.

2013
In 2013, the league has seen the return of one of its original teams, Kragujevac Wild Boars. Blue Devils and Patriots have left the league.

The bowl game was again played on Ada Ciganlija stadium in Belgrade on 7 July, with Vukovi reclaiming the title after the most convincing bowl game win over Wild Boars 42–0.

2014
The 2014 season was again played with the same four teams: Budapest Wolves from Hungary, Belgrade Vukovi and Kragujevac Wild Boars from Serbia, and Ljubljana Silverhawks from Slovenia.

CEFL Bowl IX was played in Ivančna Gorica on 20 July, where Vukovi won the title beating Silverhawks 27–17.

2015
The 2015 season was once again played with four teams. Belgrade Vukovi and Ljubljana Silverhawks have extended their membership, accompanied by two returning teams Novi Sad Dukes from Serbia and the Cineplexx Blue Devils from Austria. Kragujevac Wild Boars and Budapest Docler Wolves have left the league.

CEFL Bowl X was played on FK Kabel stadium in Novi Sad on 5 July, where Dukes took their first trophy by beating Vukovi in a nailbiter 25–23.

2016
The 2016 season marked the expansion of the CEFL with 12 teams. Member teams from last year were joined by new additions Budapest Cowbells from Hungary and Projekt Spielberg Graz Giants from Austria, while Zagreb Patriots from Croatia returned to the fold. Former Alpe Adria Football League teams joined as well. Those were: Domžale Tigers and Kranj Alp Devils from Slovenia, Niš Imperatori and Inđija Indians from Serbia, and Sarajevo Spartans from Bosnia and Herzegovina.

CEFL Bowl XI was played on ASKÖ Stadium in Graz on 3 July, where Giants won the trophy by outgunning Vukovi 52–49 in another cliffhanger.

2017
CEFL Championship continued to gain traction. Problems with IFAF leadership which started the year before lead to the discontinuation of IFAF Europe Champions League competition. Some of its team members joined CEFL Championship, while others formed Northern European Football League (NEFL). CEFL Championship was composed of two conferences:
 Western Conference: Triangle Razorbacks, Panthers Wrocław, Swarco Raiders Tirol
 Eastern Conference: SBB Vukovi Beograd, Kragujevac Wild Boars, Budapest Cowbells, Koç Rams

This year the league also introduced CEFL Cup, played in two conferences as a developmental competition:
 Western Conference: Kranj Alp Devils, Sarajevo Spartans, Zagreb Patriots
 Eastern Conference: Novi Sad GAT Dukes, Inđija Indians, Sirmium Legionaries, Belgrade Blue Dragons

CEFL Bowl XII was played at the Tivoli stadium in Innsbruck on 10 June, where Swarco Raiders overpowered Kragujevac Wild Boars 55-20. CEFL Cup finals were played the same day in Kranj, the home of Alp Devils who were shutout by Novi Sad Gat Dukes 0–59.

2018
Most prominent season in organization's existence. CEFL Championship was played by 6 champions: 5 national and a returning CEFL Bowl XII winner. It was made possible by two new additions, Prague Black Panthers from Czechia in the Western Conference and Moscow Patriots from Russia in the Eastern, while Cowbells, Razorbacks and Vukovi exited.

CEFL Cup was transformed into a cup competition for high-level teams and featured four participants. Vukovi, who left the Championship and Cowbells, Hungarian champions, were former CEFL members. Two national vice-champion teams were added to membership: Seahawks Gdynia from Poland and Sakarya Tatankalari from Turkey.

CEFL Bowl XIII was again played on the Tivoli stadium in Innsbruck on 9 June, where Swarco Raiders defended the title by beating Koç Rams 49–20. CEFL Cup finals took place the following day on the BASK stadium in Belgrade, where Vukovi beat Seahawks 55–41.

The Superfinal game between CEFL and NEFL champions was played on 30 June at Gentofte Sportspark in Copenhagen, where Swarco Raiders beat Copenhagen Towers 45–20 to claim the title.

2019
This year the organization has surpassed all of its previous seasons. CEFL Championship participants hailed from 7 countries. Five of them were national champions, including the current standing two-time CEFL Bowl winners, and the other 2 were vice-champions. Newcomers from previous season have exited the Championship, and there were 3 new additions. Thonon Black Panthers and Milan Seamen formed the Western Conference together with Swarco Raiders. Calanda Broncos reinforced the Eastern Conference with Kragujevac Wild Boars and Koç Rams, and Panthers Wrocław were relocated to it.

CEFL Cup doubled its membership to eight top-level teams. Previous season's additions have departed, and the newcomers were Italian league finalists Bolzano Giants, Russian champions Moscow Spartans, Romanian champions Bucharest Rebels, and Turkish Istanbul İTÜ Hornets, while Hungarian champions Budapest Wolves and Russian runners-up Moscow Patriots returned to CEFL flock.

CEFL Bowl XIV was played in Chur, Switzerland on 8 June between Calanda Broncos and Swarco Raiders. This very exciting duel went to Swarco Raiders in the final seconds, and they triumphed by 46–42. Another excitement followed a day later in Bolzano Italy, where Moscow Spartans outlasted Bolzano Giants 15–14.

ECTC finals, a successor of the Superfinals, were played at the Tivoli stadium in Innsbruck, where Swarco Raiders conquered Vienna Vikings with a 35–10 score.

2020
In 2020, 12 teams (10 national champions and 2 vice-champions) should have participated in the 15th CEFL season: Swarco Raiders, Vienna Vikings, Calanda Broncos, Wroclaw Panthers, Thonon Black Panthers, Milan Seamen, Copenhagen Towers, Badalona Dracs, Stockholm Mean Machines, Kragujevac Wild Boars, Koc Rams, and Moscow Spartans. The season was ultimately cancelled due to the COVID-19 pandemic.

2021
After taking 2020 off due to the COVID-19 pandemic, CEFL announced its return for 2021, with a tournament that, for the first time ever, will feature a team from the German Football League. The tournament was initially supposed to feature 11 teams from 10 countries, including 8 national champions. However, some of the extended pandemic lockdowns have forced some teams to withdraw, and CEFL decided to start the tournament with only 8 teams. The Schwäbisch Hall Unicorns won the title in the first year they participated with a last second victory over the Raiders Tirol.

Source: european-league.com

Notes

2022 
On 22 December 2021, the CEFL announced that the 2022 season would expand the cup tournament format to four rounds. Thirteen teams were invited, with nine national champions among the invitations, along with the defending CEFL Champions. The Unicorns defended their title.

CEFL Bowls

Champions

Membership of CEFL Championship

Note: teams whose names are in bold are current participants.

References

External links
Central European Football League

American football leagues in Europe
2005 establishments in Europe
Sports leagues established in 2005